Ronald Joseph Mulock AO KCSG (11 January 1930 – 4 September 2014) was an Australian politician. A former City of Penrith mayor, he was an Australian Labor Party member of the New South Wales Legislative Assembly from 1971 to 1988. He was Deputy Premier of New South Wales under Neville Wran and Barrie Unsworth from 1984 to 1988.

Early years
Ron Mulock was born in the Sydney suburb of Darlinghurst on 11 January 1930 and baptised a Catholic. His surname at birth was Moore but he was fostered at ten months to Elizabeth Mulock (née Goode). She adopted Ron when he was 14. He was educated at St Declan’s in Penshurst and De La Salle College (now Casimir Catholic College), Marrickville. Mulock was an outstanding sportsman at school and subsequently played first grade cricket between 1949 and 1962 for the St George, Waverley and Cumberland Clubs.  In the 1959–60 season he was the highest wicket-taker (49) in the Sydney First Grade Competition. At his peak, Mulock was said to be one of the best fast bowlers outside the Test team. He was a foundation member and later Patron of the Penrith Panthers Rugby League team.

Mulock studied law part-time and received an LL.B from the University of Sydney in 1957. He was admitted as a Solicitor of the Supreme Court on 2 September 1955 and started his own practice in Penrith on Sydney’s western outskirts. By the time Mulock went into Parliament in 1971, his firm employed 20 people. He was an alderman on Penrith City Council for six years, and served as Mayor from 1968 to 1971. Mulock was initially elected as an independent but joined the ALP in 1968.

Political career
As a state parliamentarian, Mulock represented Nepean from 1971 to 1973, Penrith from 1973 to 1981 and St Marys from 1981 until his retirement at the 1988 election. After the 1973 election, Mulock became Shadow Attorney-General and Justice Minister.

When the Wran government achieved power in May 1976 (ending the Labor Party's 11-year period in opposition), Mulock became Minister of Justice (until October 1978) and Minister for Services (until February 1977). He was also Minister for Housing from February 1977 to October 1978, Minister for Mineral Resources and Development from October 1978 to February 1980 and Minister for Mineral Resources and Technology from February 1980 to October 1981. Mulock served as Minister for Education from October 1981 to February 1984.

A champion of increased resources for Sydney’s west, Mulock expanded Milperra College of Advanced Education into the Macarthur Institute of Higher Education and worked for the establishment of a university in western Sydney. On 20 March 1987, Mulock and Premier Barrie Unsworth (who had taken over from Wran the previous year) concluded a Commonwealth/State agreement that resulted in the establishment of the University of Western Sydney in 1989.

On 10 February 1984, Mulock's strong performance and personal popularity led to him becoming Deputy Premier after the retirement of Jack Ferguson. He was opposed by both major ALP factions and Wran, his chief rivals for the job having been the left-wing Frank Walker and the right-wing Terry Sheahan. On the first ballot, Walker polled 32 votes, Mulock 20, and Sheahan 17. When Sheahan was eliminated from the contest, all but one of his preferences flowed to Mulock who was victorious by 36 votes to 33.

Mulock was Minister for Health from February 1984 to 1986. It was the most demanding period in his 12-year Ministerial career. During most of his tenure he dealt with a bitter dispute with the medical profession. Mulock was Minister for Transport from February 1986 to November 1987. With Education and Health, Transport was one of the top three recurrent spending portfolios. He held all three in succession, the only NSW Minister since Federation to have done so. Mulock served as Attorney-General from November 1987 until the defeat of the Unsworth government in March 1988.

After politics
In 1988, Mulock was made an Officer of the Order of Australia in recognition of his services to the NSW Parliament. After leaving politics, he was involved in commercial consultancy and legal mediation. Mulock was appointed to the Greiner Government’s Electricity Transmission Planning Committee in 1991 and chaired the Penrith Lakes Committee from 1996 to 2001. He was involved with sporting, education welfare and disability advocacy groups. In 2013, Pope Francis appointed Ron a Knight Commander of the Order of St Gregory the Great ‘for dedication to the faith and service to the community’.

Ron Mulock died on 4 September 2014 at the age of 84. He is survived by his wife (since 11 May 1957)  Desley, two sons, a daughter and nine grandchildren. Two sons predeceased him. Mulock is interred at Pine Grove Memorial Park.

References

Further reading

1930 births
2014 deaths
Deputy Premiers of New South Wales
Members of the New South Wales Legislative Assembly
Australian Labor Party mayors
Mayors of Penrith, New South Wales
New South Wales local councillors
Officers of the Order of Australia
Knights Commander of the Order of St Gregory the Great
Australian Roman Catholics
Sydney Law School alumni
Australian solicitors
Australian Labor Party members of the Parliament of New South Wales
Attorneys General of New South Wales